Phaeosoma griseicolle is a species of  ulidiid or picture  winged fly in the genus Meckelia of the family Tephritidae.

References

Ulidiidae